Adam Cairns (1802–1881) was a Scottish Presbyterian minister. In 1837 he became minister of Cupar. At the disruption in 1843 he sided with the Free Church, and was employed in parochial work until 1853, when he accepted a commission from the Colonial Committee of the Free Church to proceed to Melbourne, where he arrived in September of that year. There, amidst the excitement of the gold fever, he laid the foundations of Presbyterianism in Victoria, acting as pastor of the Chalmers Church Congregation till 1865, when, his health failing, he became an emeritus minister, retaining his standing in the Church without pastoral charge. He died on his birthday January 30, 1881.

Early life and education

Adam Cairns was born at the manse of Longforgan, on 30 January 1802. Of that parish his father, also called Adam Cairns, was minister for many years. Dr. Cairns’s father appears to have belonged to the parish of Temple. His mother’s father was minister of the parish of Kinnaird, in the Carse of Gowrie. He was descended from a long line of ministers.

Having received the rudimentary part of his education in his native parish, he entered the University of St. Andrews before he was fourteen years of age—too young, as he himself has often confessed. Yet as a student he did more than hold his own among his class-fellows, many of them by far his senior in years. Throughout his whole course of study, both in the University and in the Theological Hall, he occupied a distinguished place. With more than average natural gifts he combined more than average application. He was a hard working student. Of himself he has been heard to say, “I have no great natural ability; and any measure of success to which I have attained has been won through hard labour and close application to present duty.”

He was licensed as a preacher by the Presbytery of Cupar on 5 October 1824. Soon after this, he passed through a severe ordeal, which lasted for several years. His health at this stage suffered greatly, and threatened for a time entirely to give way. Cast on his own resources, he was obliged to support himself by private teaching. In various ways his strength was overtaxed; he was in a state of physical exhaustion, nervous and irritable.

Early ministry
After serving for a time as assistant to Henry Moncreiff, minister of the parish of St. Cuthbert’s, Edinburgh, Cairns was presented to the parish of Manor, in the county of Peebles, where he was ordained on 21 August 1828. The parish is a quiet pastoral valley and for four years and a-half he went in and out among them.

But now his work in this his first charge was drawing to a close. His health was again seriously affected. His old complaint returned upon him. It was brought on, or at all events accelerated, by the illness of a brother, who had returned from America in quest of health. Having come to reside at the manse at Manor, Mr. Cairns was unremitting in his attention to him. The complaint in his brother’s case got worse. He died. The care and anxiety of waiting at that death-bed left serious effects on Cairns’s own health. And just at the time when a change was desirable, he received a presentation to the parish of Dunbog, in the north-west of Fife. Feeling it to be his duty to accept the offer, he was inducted into that charge, on 7 April 1833.  Being strictly a rural parish, the work was easy. It gave the opportunity for recruiting his shattered health. It was here, and on 11 February 1834, that Cairns was married to Miss Jessie Ballingall. After a successful ministry in his second charge of about equal duration with that of his first, Mr. Cairns was translated to Cupar-Fife.

Ministry in Cupar
It was a collegiate charge. He was inducted on 1 September 1837. In the midst of his labour his strength again gave way. For months his life hung quivering in the balance. He was an invalid for years. Again there is another break, and it seemed at the time that his ministry was at end. At the Disruption in 1843 he sided with the Free Church. In November 1847, during the afternoon service, he was struck down in the pulpit. He was carried to the vestry, and there laid down as a dying man. Contrary to expectation, he soon recovered. Having gone to Gibraltar, in the hope that the climate there would renovate his shattered system, and feeling greatly benefited by the change, he hired a hall in the principal street, where he preached morning and evening, the morning attendance being always crowded. The Free Church minister of Cupar was able to contribute, to the current literature of the day. In view of this, and in particular, in recognition of an able and interesting volume produced by him, entitled "The Second Woe", the Senatus of St. Andrews University conferred on him the degree of D.D. on 9 April 1853.

Move to Australia
The gold discovery in Australia was attracting universal interest and migrants were landing daily there in thousands. The Free Church determined to strengthen the hands of the ministers already in Australia, by sending immediately other ten or twelve at least. Ten young men gave their consent to go. They were but newly licensed, and though now to be ordained, they had no experience. It was needful, therefore, to secure along with them one or two ministers of standing and experience. Two such men were Mackintosh Mackay, of Dunoon, and the other the Rev. Dr. Cairns, of Cupar.

The twelve ministers, sailing some together, and others singly, in different vessels, all arrived safely in Australia. The sphere assigned to Dr. Cairns was Melbourne. It was then in a state of strange transition; passing from a small town into the dimensions of a great and populous city. There were two congregations of the Free Church in Melbourne at the time, but only one church, the second congregation worshipping in a rented hall. Cairns at once commenced his labours, preaching in the Temperance Hall in the forenoon, and in Knox’s Church in the evening. A large congregation sprang into existence at once. It was one of the largest in the southern hemisphere. From his first public appearance it was felt by all classes that he was to wield an immense power in the colony. On a valuable piece of ground on the Eastern Hill, granted by the Government, a large wooden erection was hastily run up, which served as a church for two or three years, until a more substantial building was erected. Here Dr. Cairns ministered to a large and attached congregation for more than twenty years. In 1876 he demitted his charge, constrained to do so on account of advancing years and failing strength.

He died at home in Richmond, Melbourne on 30 January 1881.

Works
Some  Objections to Universal Atonement Stated and the Current Objections to a Particular and Efficacious Atonement considered, two discourses (Cupar,  1844)
On the Origin and Obligation of the Sabbath, being No. 1, Sermons on the Sabbath (Dundee, 1847)
Account of  Dunbog  (New  Statistical Account, ix.)
The Second Woe (Edinburgh, 1852)
Sermon LXIII.  (Free  Church  Pulpit,  ii.)

Family

He  married 11 February 1834, Jessie (died 26 August 1906), daughter of — Ballingall, Ayton, and had issue —
Margaret, born 26 August 1835
Elizabeth, born 25 February 1837
Jessie, born 5 September 1840
Ebenezer Adam, born 8 January 1843

See also
James Forbes

References

Citations

Sources

External links

1802 births
1881 deaths
19th-century Ministers of the Free Church of Scotland
19th-century Ministers of the Church of Scotland